Denckmannites is a trilobite in the order Phacopida, that existed during the upper Silurian in what is now the Czech Republic. It was described by Wedekind in 1914, and the type species is Denckmannites volborthi, which was originally described under the genus Phacops by Barrande in 1852. It also contains the species Denckmannites morator, and Denckmannites primaevus. The type locality was the Kopanina Formation.

References

External links
 Denckmannites at the Paleobiology Database

Phacopidae
Fossil taxa described in 1914
Silurian trilobites of Europe
Fossils of the Czech Republic
Paleozoic life of Quebec